Nottingham is an unincorporated community with in the Rural Municipality of Reciprocity No. 32, Saskatchewan, Canada. The community is located between Storthoaks, and Alida, Saskatchewan on Highway 361. The community once had a post office, general store and 2 Saskatchewan Wheat Pool elevators.

A community hall still exists there and is used by members of the local communities and municipality.

See also 

 List of communities in Saskatchewan

References

Reciprocity No. 32, Saskatchewan
Unincorporated communities in Saskatchewan
Division No. 1, Saskatchewan